Anton Boskovic (27 January 1933 – 16 June 2022) was an Australian soccer referee.

Career
Born in Blato, Croatia, Yugoslavia, he emigrated to Australia from the former Yugoslavia in 1955.

Boskovic is known for having refereed two matches in the FIFA World Cup, one in 1974 and one in 1982. He was inducted into the Football Federation Australia Hall of Fame in 1999.

In 1982 Boskovic was invited by the Australian Government to join an independent migration review panel.

Boskovic died on 16 June 2022, at the age of 89.

References

External links
 Tony Boscovic – referee profile at WorldFootball.net

1933 births
2022 deaths
Australian soccer referees
FIFA World Cup referees
1982 FIFA World Cup referees
Australian people of Croatian descent
Yugoslav emigrants to Australia
People from Korčula